Portengen is a hamlet in the Dutch province of Utrecht.

Portengen was a separate municipality from 1818 to 1857, when it was merged with Breukelen-Nijenrode.

The hamlet was first mentioned in 1217 as Britannien, and is a reference to Brittany, France. It started as a peat excavation colony during the 11th and 12th century. The hamlet of Portengensebrug is an enclave within Portengen. In 1840, Portengen was home to 55 people.

Gallery

References

Populated places in Utrecht (province)
Former municipalities of Utrecht (province)
Stichtse Vecht
1818 establishments in the Netherlands